Ace of Cups is a card used in Latin suited playing cards (Italian, Spanish and tarot decks). It is the Ace from the suit of Cups. In Tarot, it is part of what card readers call the "Minor Arcana", and as the first in the suit of Cups, signifies beginnings in the area of the social and emotional in life. Connected with the number 4, 40, 400, 4000.

Tarot cards are used throughout much of Europe to play tarot card games.

In English-speaking countries, where the games are largely unknown, Tarot cards came to be used primarily for Tarot reading. Some people believe the card depicts the Holy Grail.

Symbolism
In Tarot reading, the Ace of Cups means joy and inner peace from friends and family. In the Rider–Waite–Smith deck, the five streams pouring out of the cup represent the five senses: sight, smell, hearing, taste, and touch.

As a symbol of possibility in the area of deep feelings, intimacy, attunement, compassion and love, in divination, it shows that a seed of emotional awareness has been planted in your life, though you may not yet recognize it. When the seed sprouts, it could take almost any form. It might be an attraction, strong feeling, intuitive knowing, or sympathetic reaction. On the outside, it could be an offer, gift, opportunity, encounter, or synchronistic event.

Divination
This Ace requires the diviner to examine their life to see how creating love works there. This card often means that love is the essence of the situation, the heart of the matter. It may or may not be romantic love, and can depend on other cards around it. The inquirer may be guided to look for ways to connect with others at this level: is there someone to forgive, or is forgiveness even needed? Can anger be replaced with peace, division replaced with empathy? Is it necessary to let feelings show? Shared or kept secret, The Ace of Cups always indicates "your time" is coming or may be arriving presently.

This card also suggests inner attunement and spirituality. Cups are the suit of the heart, and the Ace stands for the direct knowing that comes from the heart. Suggestions for interpretation include: "Trust what your feelings are telling you," "Seek out ways to explore your consciousness, seek out paths that lead to your connections with Spirit," "Allow the power of your emotions to guide you in a new direction," and "Embrace the love that is the Ace of Cups."

Key meanings
According to one source, these are five key meanings associated with the Ace of Cups:

 Abundance
 Creativity
 Intense relationship
 Satisfaction
 Success

Function
The Ace of Cups represents issues of love, intimacy, deeper feelings, and compassion. It announces the new beginning of great possibility in this area of life. It can mark the start of a new relationship, or a deeper connection to an existing one. While this may be a romantic relationship, it can also signify a friendship. A seed has been planted and once it sprouts, it can take almost any form, from an attraction to an intuitive knowing. Trust in the feelings that are present. Furthermore, this card can signify a gift or opportunity. An offer may be forthcoming. If this card appears on a reading where a reader wants to understand a timeline for any situation, an ace of cup symbolizes a duration of one week. Reversed, this card indicates that the creation of a deeper connection to another is being blocked. This can be due to circumstances or because of a fear of intimacy. This is the time to consider how the past is connected to the present, and how it may be interfering with closeness to others. Examine circumstances in life to determine if time, other people, or work is getting in the way of developing new relationships.

References

External links 

Suit of Cups